The 2009 S.League season is Geylang United's 14th season in the top flight of Singapore football and 34th year in existence as a football club.

Squad

Coaching staff

Pre-Season Transfers

In

Out

Mid-Season Transfers

In

Out

References

Geylang International FC seasons
Singaporean football clubs 2009 season